Óscar Giraldo (born 13 April 1973) is a Colombian former cyclist. He competed in the men's individual road race at the 1996 Summer Olympics.

References

External links
 

1973 births
Living people
Colombian male cyclists
Olympic cyclists of Colombia
Cyclists at the 1996 Summer Olympics
Sportspeople from Bogotá
20th-century Colombian people